The Moroccan Throne Cup or the Throne Cup is a knockout football tournament in Moroccan football, organized by the Royal Moroccan Football Federation.The first club to win this cup was Mouloudia Oujda. Since the inception of the cup, the system has been one-match, but this system has been modified to back and forth.

The Throne Cup champion qualifies directly to the CAF Confederation Cup, but if the cup champion is the same as the league champion in that season or a participant in the CAF Champions League, the club that played the final is the one who compensates him in the external competition, and the ASFAR is the club most crowned with the title Throne Cup with 12 titles as a record. The current champions are RS Berkane.

History 

MC Oujda won the first two edition of the throne cup after defeating Wydad AC in both finals.

Format 
The current format features 4 preliminary rounds and the final phase. All games are one-legged.

The final phase starts with the Round of 32 where the 16 teams qualified from the fourth round are joined by all 16 Botola teams. Draws are "blind", meaning a Botola team can be drawn in one match with a team from the same league. The Round of 32 is followed by the Round of 16 matches, quarterfinals, semifinals and a final. Although not only one stadium has hosted the final, it is usually played in the Prince Moulay Abdellah Stadium in Rabat.

Results of finals
{| class="wikitable sortable"
|-
! No.
! Season
! Winner (Number of titles)
! Score
! Runner-up
! Ref
|-
! 1
| 1956–57
| Mouloudia Oujda (1)
| style="text-align:center;"|*1–1
| Wydad Casablanca
|
|-
! 2
| 1957–58
| Mouloudia Oujda (2)
| style="text-align:center;"|2–1
| Wydad Casablanca
|
|-
! 3
| 1958–59
| AS FAR (1)
| style="text-align:center;"|1–0
| Mouloudia Oujda
|
|-
! 4
| 1959–60
| Mouloudia Oujda (3)
| style="text-align:center;"|1–0
| FUS de Rabat
|
|-
! 5
| 1960–61
| KAC Kenitra (1)
| style="text-align:center;"|1–0
| Wydad Casablanca
|
|-
! 6
| 1961–62
| Mouloudia Oujda (4)
| style="text-align:center;"|1–0
| Kawkab Marrakesh
|
|-
! 7
| 1962–63
| Kawkab Marrakesh (1)
| style="text-align:center;"|3–2 (aet)
| Hassania Agadir
|
|-
! 8
| 1963–64
| Kawkab Marrakesh (2) 
| style="text-align:center;"|3–2
| Wydad Casablanca
|
|-
! 9
| 1964–65
| Kawkab Marrakesh (3)
| style="text-align:center;"|3–1
| Raja CA
|
|-
! 10
| 1965–66
| CODM Meknès (1)
| style="text-align:center;"|2–0
| MAS Fès
|
|-
! 11
| 1966–67
| FUS de Rabat (1)
| style="text-align:center;"|2–1
| RS Settat
|
|-
! 12
| 1967–68
| Racing Casablanca (1)
| style="text-align:center;"|1–0 (aet)
| Raja CA
|
|-
! 13
| 1968–69
| Renaissance Settat (1)
| style="text-align:center;"|2–1 (aet)
| KAC Kenitra
|
|-
! 14
| 1969–70
| Wydad Casablanca (1)
| style="text-align:center;"|1–0
| Renaissance Settat
|
|-
! 15
| 1970–71
| AS FAR (2)
| style="text-align:center;"|1–1 (aet, 8–7 pens)
| MAS Fès
|
|-
! 16 
| 1971–72 ||colspan=3 style="background:#efefef; text-align:center;"|Final Chabab Mohammédia vs Racing Casablanca not played. Title goes to SCCM by a draw.|
|-
! 17
| 1972–73
| FUS de Rabat (2)
| style="text-align:center;"|3–2
| Ittihad Khemisset
|
|-
! 18
| 1973–74
| Raja CA (1)
| style="text-align:center;"|1–0
| MAS Fès
|
|-
! 19
| 1974–75
| SCC Mohammédia (2)
| style="text-align:center;"|2–0
| Union Sidi Kacem
|
|-
! 20
| 1975–76
| FUS de Rabat (3)
| style="text-align:center;"|1–0
| KAC Kenitra
|
|-
! 21
| 1976–77
| Raja CA (2)
| style="text-align:center;"|1–0 (aet)
| Difaa El Jadida
|
|-
! 22
| 1977–78
| Wydad Casablanca (2)
| style="text-align:center;"|3–0
| Renaissance Kénitra
|
|-
! 23
| 1978–79
| Wydad Casablanca (3)
| style="text-align:center;"|2–1
| SCC Mohammédia
|
|-
! 24
| 1979–80
| MAS Fès (1)
| style="text-align:center;"|1–0
| Union Sidi Kacem
|
|-
! 25
| 1980–81
| Wydad Casablanca (4)
| style="text-align:center;"|2–1
| CODM Meknès
|
|-
! 26
| 1981–82
| Raja CA (3)
| style="text-align:center;"|1–0
| Renaissance Kénitra
|
|-
! 27
| 1982–83
| Olympique Casablanca (1)
| style="text-align:center;"|1–1 (aet, 5–4 pens)
| Raja CA
|
|-
! 28
| 1983–84
| AS FAR (3)
| style="text-align:center;"|1–0
| Renaissance Kénitra
|
|-
! 29
| 1984–85
| AS FAR (4)
| style="text-align:center;"|3–0
| Difaa El Jadida
|
|-
! 30
| 1985–86
| AS FAR(5)
| style="text-align:center;"|3–1
| Difaa El Jadida
|
|-
! 31
| 1986–87
| Kawkab Marrakesh (4)
| style="text-align:center;"|4–0
| Renaissance Berkane
|
|-
! 32
| 1987–88
| MAS Fès (2)
| style="text-align:center;"|0–0 (4–3 pens)
| AS FAR
|
|-
! 33
| 1988–89
| Wydad Casablanca (5)
| style="text-align:center;"|2–0
| Olympique Khouribga
|
|-
! 34
| 1989–90
| Olympique Casablanca (2)
| style="text-align:center;"|0–0 (aet, 4–2 pens)
| AS FAR
|
|-
! 35
| 1990–91
| Kawkab Marrakesh (5)
| style="text-align:center;"|2–1
| KAC Kenitra
|
|-
! 36
| 1991–92
| Olympique Casablanca (3)
| style="text-align:center;"|1–0
| Raja CA
|
|-
! 37
| 1992–93
| Kawkab Marrakesh (6)
| style="text-align:center;"|1–0
| MAS Fès
|
|-
! 38
| 1993–94
| Wydad Casablanca (6)
| style="text-align:center;"|1–0
| Olympique Khouribga
|
|-
! 39
| 1994–95
| FUS de Rabat (4)
| style="text-align:center;"|2–0
| Olympique Khouribga
|
|-
! 40
| 1995–96
| Raja CA (4)
| style="text-align:center;"|1–0 (aet)
| AS FAR
|
|-
! 41
| 1996–97
| Wydad Casablanca (7)
| style="text-align:center;"|1–0 (aet)
| Kawkab Marrakesh
|
|-
! 42
| 1997–98
| Wydad Casablanca (8)
| style="text-align:center;"|2–1
| AS FAR
|
|-
! 43
| 1998–99
| AS FAR (6)
| style="text-align:center;"|1–0 (aet)
| SCC Mohammédia
|
|-
! 44
| 1999–2000
| Majd Casablanca (1)
| style="text-align:center;"|1–1 (aet, 8–7 pens)
| RS Settat
|
|-
! 45
| 2000–01
| Wydad Casablanca (9)
| style="text-align:center;"|1–0 (aet)
| MAS Fès
|
|-
! 46
| 2001–02
| Raja CA (5)
| style="text-align:center;"|2–0
| MAS Fès
|
|-
! 47
| 2002–03
| AS FAR (7)
| style="text-align:center;"|1–0
| Wydad Casablanca
|
|-
! 48
| 2003–04
| AS FAR (8)
| style="text-align:center;"|0–0 (aet, 3–0 pens)
| Wydad Casablanca
|
|-
! 49
| 2004–05
| Raja CA (6)
| style="text-align:center;"|0–0 (aet, 5–4 pens)
| Olympique Khouribga
|
|-
! 50
| 2005–06
| Olympique Khouribga (1)
| style="text-align:center;"|1–0
| Hassania Agadir
|
|-
! 51
| 2006–07
| AS FAR (9)
| style="text-align:center;"|1–1 (aet, 5–4 pens)
| Rachad Bernoussi
|
|-
! 52
| 2007–08
| AS FAR (10)
| style="text-align:center;"|1–0 (aet)
| MAS Fès
|
|-
! 53
| 2008–09
| AS FAR (11)
| style="text-align:center;"|1–1 (aet, 5–4 pens)
| FUS de Rabat
|
|-
! 54
| 2009–10
| FUS de Rabat (5)
| style="text-align:center;"|2–1
| MAS Fès
|
|-
! 55
| 2010–11
| MAS Fès (3)
| style="text-align:center;"|1–0
| CODM Meknès
|
|-
! 56
| 2011–12
| Raja CA (7)
| style="text-align:center;"|0–0 (aet, 5–4 pens)
| AS FAR
|
|-
! 57
| 2012–13
| Difaa El Jadida (1)
| style="text-align:center;"|0–0 (aet, 5–4 pens)
| Raja CA
|
|-
! 58
| 2013–14
| FUS de Rabat (6)
| style="text-align:center;"|2–0
| Renaissance Berkane
|
|-
! 59
| 2014–15
| Olympique Khouribga (2)
| style="text-align:center;"|0–0 (aet, 4–1 pens)
| FUS de Rabat
|
|-
! 60
| 2015–16
| MAS Fès (4)
| style="text-align:center;"|2–1 (aet)
| Olympic Safi
|
|-
! 61
| 2016–17
| Raja CA (8)
| style="text-align:center;"|1–1 (aet, 3–1 pens)
| Difaa El Jadida
|
|-
! 62
| 2017–18
| Renaissance Berkane (1)
| style="text-align:center;"|2–2 (aet, 3–2 pens)
| Wydad Fès
|
|- 
! 63
| 2018–19
| TAS de Casablanca (1)
| style="text-align:center;"|2–1
| Hassania Agadir
|
|- 
! 64
| 2019–20
| AS FAR (12)
| style="text-align:center;"|3–0
| Moghreb Tétouan
|
|- 
! 65
| 2020–21
| Renaissance Berkane (2)
| style="text-align:center;"|0–0 (aet, 3–2 pens)
| Wydad Casablanca
|
|- 
|}
Mouloudia Oujda won because they scored first

Performance

 Performance by clubs 
List of football clubs ranked by total wins and runners-up.

 By city 

 Records 
 Most titles won: 12 wins   
 ASFAR (1959, 1971, 1984, 1985, 1986, 1999, 2003, 2004, 2007, 2008, 2009 and 2021) Most consecutive wins: 3 wins 
 ASFAR (1984, 1985, 1986) and (2007, 2008, 2009) Kawkab Marrakech (1963, 1964 and 1965)''
 Most Finals: 17 finals
 ASFAR 
 Most finals lost: 8 finals
 Maghreb Fes

References

External links
FRMF Palmarès
RSSSF competition history

 
Football competitions in Morocco
Morocco
Recurring sporting events established in 1957
1957 establishments in Morocco